Dichosciadium is a monotypic genus of flowering plants belonging to the family Apiaceae. The sole species is
Dichosciadium ranunculaceum.

Its native range is Southeastern Australia.

References

Azorelloideae
Monotypic Apiaceae genera